Gare do Oriente, or alternately, the Lisbon Oriente Station is one of the main Portuguese intermodal transport hubs, and is situated in the civil parish of Parque das Nações, municipality of Lisbon.

History

In 1994, the station was proposed as part of the modernization of the Linha do Norte, a modification to the rail line to facilitate the future development of a new station in eastern Lisbon. Located along Avenida D. João II, over Avenida de Berlim and Rua Conselheiro Mariano de Carvalho, the station was planned to occupy the lands once occupied by Apeadeiro dos Olivais, which was demolished in the 1990s in order to make way for the new station.

Bids for building the project on lands to be used for the 1998 exposition were solicited internationally. The concept was originally designed by Spanish architect Santiago Calatrava in 1995, and built by Necso.

The station was inaugurated on 19 May 1998, as part of the celebrations marking the opening of the Expo '98 world's fair. At the time of its opening it was considered the largest intermodal station in Portugal, winning the Brunel Award on 7 October 1998, in the category of large new construction projects.

Architecture

Ambitious in its conception, the modernist station includes a Lisbon Metro station, a high-speed commuter and regional train hub, a local, national and international bus station, a shopping centre and a police station. The rail station was conceived with a multi-modal platform intersecting the cardinal axes for the various transport modes.

With some influence from Gothic architecture, the station bears considerable resemblance to Santiago Calatrava's earlier Allen Lambert Galleria within Toronto's Brookfield Place. Calatrava's objective was to realize a new space with ample room and functionality providing multiple connections between various zones in the metropolitan area of Lisbon.

One important aspect of the station is its link to the urban environment in which it was constructed. The decision to elevate the rail line, for example, eliminated a physical barrier between the city and the Tagus River margin. The station, covered in a lattice structure of glass and metal, is constructed of reinforced concrete and raised  over the roadway.

In addition to the many galleries that are part of the station, it is connected to the Centro Comercial Vasco da Gama (Vasco da Gama Commercial Centre/Mall) and the Lisbon Metro through a subterranean access, as well as a first floor connection to the train platforms and a pedestrian walkway.

Services

References

Notes

Sources

External links
 Portal das Nações Discover the Orient Station

Santiago Calatrava structures
Oriente
Railway stations in Lisbon
Neo-futurism architecture
Parque das Nações
1998 establishments in Portugal